, previously known as , is a trans-Neptunian object orbiting in the Kuiper belt of the outermost Solar System. It was first observed by the Outer Solar System Origins Survey using the Canada–France–Hawaii Telescope at Mauna Kea on 13 April 2015.

Description 

It is one a small number of detached objects with perihelion distances of 30 AU or more, and semi-major axes of 250 AU or more. Such objects cannot reach such orbits without some perturbing object, which has led to the Planet Nine hypothesis, that a massive trans-Neptunian planet is the perturber. However  is an interesting outlier of these trans-Neptunian objects that make one of the lines of evidence for Planet Nine. Unlike the others, the shape of whose orbits (longitudes of perihelion) either cluster in anti-alignment with the modeled orbit of Planet Nine or cluster in alignment with it, 's major axis is almost at a right angle to that of the putative planet. Konstantin Batygin of Caltech suggests that this is only a cosmetic disagreement with his and Mike Brown's predictions for the positions of these bodies. In fact, he notes that without having to change the putative orbit of Planet Nine,  falls into one of the predicted resonant orbits. This, he notes, may be a coincidence.  This conclusion, however, is not unanimous, and others have instead suggested that the existence of a population of objects with orbital characteristics similar to those of  may be at odds with the Planet Nine hypothesis.

References

External links 
 OSSOS VI. Striking Biases in the detection of large semimajor axis Trans-Neptunian Objects 16 June 2017
 MPEC 2017-M25 : 2015 GT50
 OSSOS survey by the Canada–France–Hawaii Telescope
 

Minor planet object articles (unnumbered)

20150413